Henry Swoboda (October 29, 1897 –  August 13, 1990) was a Czechoslovakian conductor and musicologist and, with James Grayson and Mischa Naida, co-founder of U.S. Westminster Records which flourished in the late 1940s and throughout the 1950s as a purveyor of classical music recordings. Swoboda made many recordings for Westminster and the Concert Hall record label, including the first commercially available recording of Bruckner's Sixth Symphony. He worked from 1927 to 1931 for Electrola, Berlin and later as conductor for Radio-Prag. He was a Guestprofessor at University of Southern California between 1931–1939 and emigrated 1939 to the USA.

Lit: Horst Weber, Manuela Schwartz (Ed.), Sources relating to the history of émigré musicians, 1933–1950, vol. 2, Munich 2005, p.272.

1897 births
1990 deaths
20th-century conductors (music)